Edrioasteroidea is an extinct class of echinoderms. The living animal would have resembled a pentamerously symmetrical disc or cushion. They were obligate encrusters and attached themselves to inorganic or biologic hard substrates (frequently hardgrounds or brachiopods). A 507 million years old species, Totiglobus spencensis, is actually the first known echinoderm adapted to live on a hard surface after the soft microbial mats that covered the seafloor were destroyed in the Cambrian substrate revolution.

The oldest undisputed fossils of Edrioasteroidea are known from Cambrian (Stage 3, about 515-520 Ma ago) of Laurentia and are among the oldest known fossils of echinoderms. Some authors propose that an enigmatic Ediacaran (about 600 Ma) organism Arkarua is also an edrioasteroid, but this interpretation did not gain wide acceptance. Last edrioasteroids are known from Permian (Late Kungurian, about 270-280 Ma).

Anatomy
The body plan for this class was simple: a main body (theca), composed of many small plates, with a peripheral rim for attachment, and (in some species) a pedunculate zone for extension and retraction. Circling and sometimes attached to the body was a peripheral rim of plates. The main feature consisted of five arms, or ambulacra, in the body wall radiating outwards from the central mouth. The ambulacra grew either curved or straight.  When curved, they may all turn in the same direction or else one or two on the right side will curve opposite the others. The ambulacra are built of underlying floor plates that form the food groove and protective cover plates that roof the food groove.  The anus was under the mouth region and was made of small triangular plates to form a cone-shaped area. The bottom surface of the theca is unplated.

Edrioasteroid species are distinguished by differences in the ambulacral curvature, the relationships of the cover plates, and ornamentation. The mode of life was sessile; they were often attached via a stalk made of small plates to a hard object such as a carbonate hardground or shell.  Several examples of epibiotic attachment have also been noted.  
  
In the discocystinids, the area between the body and peripheral rim could be extended and retracted; in so doing the two were separated. The peripheral rim became the base of the stalk which was attached to a surface.

Taxonomy

List of genera
A very incomplete list of some genera.

Walcottidiscus (oldest undisputed edrioasteroid, from the Middle Cambrian Burgess Shale community)
W. typicalus
Kailidiscus
K. chinensis
Edrioaster (type genus)
E. bigsbyi
E. priscus
Edriophus 
E. levis
Paredriophus
P. elongatus
Totiglobus
T. nimius
T. lloydi
Lebedodiscus
Foerstediscus
F. grandi
F. splendens
Cystaster
C. stellatus
Cryptogoleus
C. chapmani
Bellochthus
Streptaster
S. vorticellatus
Cryptogoleus 
C. chapmani
Carneyella
C. pilea
C. faberi
C. ulrichi
Isorophus 
I. cincinnatiensis
Isorophusella
Camptostroma 
**C. roddyi 

Rectitriordo
Agelacrinites
Krama
K. devonicum (Bassler), 1936
Parakrama
Hemicystites
H. bohemica
H. chapmani
H. devonicus
Neoisorophusella
N. lanei
N. berryi
N. maslennikovi
N. whitesidei
Curvitriordo
Thresherodiscus 
T. ramosa (Foerste, 1914)
Postibulla
P. westergaardi
Parapostibulla
P. belli
P. graysoni
Eopostibulla
Pyrgopostibulla
Yorkicystis
Torquerisediscus
Cooperidiscus
Dynocystis
Stalticodiscus
Ulrichidiscus
Clavidiscus
Discocystis
Hypsiclavus
Spiraclavus
Giganticlavus
Lispidecodus 
L. plinthotus (Kesling, 1967)

References

External links
All accessed on March 8, 2008.
http://www.ucmp.berkeley.edu/echinodermata/edrioasteroidea.html University of California, Berkeley.
http://drydredgers.org/edrio1.htm Compiled by Colin D. Sumrall.
https://web.archive.org/web/20060830083438/http://www.tulane.edu/~csumral/Abstract Spiraclavus nacoensis, a New Species of Clavate Agelacrinitid Edrioasteroid from Central Arizona by Colin D. Sumrall.
http://www.science-art.com/image.asp?id=1357 Reconstruction by Emily Damstra.
http://gsa.confex.com/gsa/2003AM/finalprogram/abstract_65113.htm Geological Society of America.
https://web.archive.org/web/20060830083430/http://www.tulane.edu/~csumral/morph.html by Colin D. Sumrall

Taxonomy
Mikko's taxonomy

Gallery

 
Cambrian first appearances
Permian extinctions